The Appointment is a 1969 psychological drama film directed by Sidney Lumet and starring Omar Sharif and Anouk Aimée. Written by James Salter, it is based on the story by Antonio Leonviola.

Plot
After becoming involved with the ex-fiancée of a business acquaintance, lawyer Federico Fendi (Omar Sharif) becomes consumed with suspicion that his new wife Carla (Anouk Aimée) may be moonlighting as a high-class prostitute.  His attempts to entrap her lead to disaster.

Cast

Production
The Appointment has three original scores. Michel Legrand composed the film's first score. That score contained only a single theme, with variations, and was ultimately rejected. A replacement score was composed by John Barry, which was used in the film's theatrical release. Barry's score also contained a single theme with variations, with the exception of select location scenes. The film had a very limited release in the United States, and when the rights were purchased for U.S. television airing by CBS, MGM re-edited the film and commissioned an entirely new score by Stu Phillips. Selections from all three scores were finally released on CD in 2003 by Film Score Monthly.

Awards and nominations
The Appointment was nominated for the Palme d'Or (Golden Palm) at the 1969 Cannes Film Festival.  The prize was instead awarded to the British black comedy If.... (1968).

See also
 List of American films of 1969

References

External links

1969 films
1960s English-language films
1960s psychological drama films
Films directed by Sidney Lumet
American psychological drama films
Films scored by John Barry (composer)
Metro-Goldwyn-Mayer films
1969 drama films
1960s American films